Julia Livia (7 – 43 AD), was the daughter of Drusus Julius Caesar and Livilla, and granddaughter of the Roman Emperor Tiberius. She was also a first cousin of the emperor Caligula, and niece of the emperor Claudius.

Biography

Early life
Julia was born in the later years of the reign of her adoptive great-grandfather, Emperor Augustus, and was the daughter of Drusus Julius Caesar (a grandson of Augustus wife' Livia Drusilla through her son Tiberius) and Livilla (a granddaughter of Livia Drusilla through her son Nero Claudius Drusus, and a granddaughter of Mark Antony through his daughter Antonia Minor). At the time of Augustus' death in AD 14, Julia, who was in early childhood, fell ill. Before he died, the aged emperor had asked his wife Livia whether Julia had recovered.

Marriages
Upon the death of Augustus, Julia's paternal grandfather, Tiberius, succeeded him as Rome's second Emperor. It was during her grandfather's rule, when she was around the age of 16, that Julia married her cousin Nero Caesar (the son of Germanicus and Agrippina the Elder). The marriage appears to have been an unhappy one, and fell victim to the machinations of the notorious palace guardsman Sejanus, who exploited his intimacy with Julia's mother Livilla to scheme against Germanicus’ family. In the words of Tacitus,  
 Whether the young prince spoke or held his tongue, silence and speech were alike criminal. Every night had its anxieties, for his sleepless hours, his dreams and sighs were all made known by his wife to her mother Livia [i.e. Livilla] and by Livia to Sejanus.

Later in 29, owing to the intrigues of Sejanus, and at the insistence of Tiberius, Nero and Agrippina were accused of treason. Nero was declared a public enemy by the Senate and taken away in chains in a closed litter. Nero was incarcerated on the island of Pontia (Ponza). The following year he was executed or driven to suicide. Cassius Dio records that Julia was now engaged to Sejanus, but this claim appears to be contradicted by Tacitus, whose authority is to be preferred. Sejanus was condemned and executed on Tiberius’ orders on 18 October 31. His lover, Julia's mother Livilla, died around the same time (probably starved by her own mother: Julia's grandmother Antonia, or committed suicide).

In 33, Julia married Gaius Rubellius Blandus, a man from an equestrian background. Despite that Blandus had been consul suffect in 18, the match was considered a disaster; Tacitus includes the event in a list of "the many sorrows which saddened Rome", which otherwise consisted of deaths of different influential people. They had at least one child, Rubellius Plautus, Juvenal, in Satire VIII.39, suggests another son, also named Gaius Rubellius Blandus and an inscription implies Julia was probably the mother of Rubellius Drusus, a child who died before the age of three. Julia also had a step-daughter Rubellia Bassa who married a maternal uncle of the future Roman Emperor Nerva.

Around 43, an agent of the Roman Emperor Claudius' wife, Empress Valeria Messalina, had falsely charged Julia with incest and immorality. Messalina considered her and her son a threat to the throne. The Emperor, her uncle Claudius, without securing any defence for his niece, had her executed 'by the sword' (Octavia 944-6: "ferro... caesa est"). She may have anticipated execution by taking her own life. Her distant relative Pomponia Graecina remained in mourning for 40 years in open defiance of the Emperor, yet was unpunished. Julia was executed around the same time as her first cousin Julia Livilla, the daughter of Germanicus and sister of the former Emperor Caligula.

Cultural depictions
In Robert Graves' novels I, Claudius and Claudius the God Julia was known as "Helen the Glutton". Graves did this as comic relief in the novels, but in reality she did not have a reputation for gluttony.

In the 1976 television adaptation she was played by Karin Foley.  It unhistorically has her mother attempting to poison her to prevent Sejanus from marrying her, but it is not explicit about whether she died as a result, so glossing over her fate under Claudius.

Ancestry

References

Citations

Biography

  (edd.), Prosopographia Imperii Romani, 3 vol., Berlin, 1897–1898. (PIR1)
  (edd.), Prosopographia Imperii Romani saeculi I, II et III, Berlin, 1933 - . (PIR2)
 Raepsaet-Charlier M.-Th., Prosopographie des femmes de l'ordre sénatorial (Ier-IIe siècles), 2 vol., Louvain, 1987, 360 ff; 633 ff.
 Lightman, Marjorie & Lightman, Benjamin. Biographical Dictionary of Greek and Roman Women. New York: Facts On File, Inc., 2000.
 Levick, Barbara, Claudius. Yale University Press, New Haven, 1990.
 Barrett, Anthony A., Agrippina: Sex, Power and Politics in the Early Roman Empire. Yale University Press, New Haven, 1996.
 Jucker, Hans & Willers, Dietrich (Hrsg.), Gesichter. Griechische und römische Bildnisse aus Schweizer Besitz, Bern 1982,  92–93.

AD 7 births
43 deaths
Julio-Claudian dynasty
1st-century Roman women
Executed ancient Roman women
People executed by the Roman Empire